Sub Command, subtitled Akula Seawolf 688(I) is a submarine simulator computer game designed by Sonalysts Combat Simulations and published for Windows systems by Electronic Arts in 2001. The player commands one submarine: a United States Navy , a Russian Navy , or a 688(I).

Sub Command sports three training missions, 23 single missions, and one 14 mission campaign. The campaign can be played from either the Russian or American side, so in effect there are two campaigns. The single missions range from search and rescue, battle group escort, tailing enemy boomers, spy missions, and general-purpose search-and-destroy. Many missions strictly prohibit firing on the enemy as they are expected to mirror real life Cold War objectives and get in—get out without being seen. Some missions offer more than one choice of submarine - they can play the mission as the Akula, 688(I), or the Seawolf.

In multiplayer mode, this game allows up to eight players to play each other via LAN, IPX or IP connections.

External links
SubSim review of game

2001 video games
Submarine simulation video games
Naval video games
Cold War video games
Strategy First games
Video games developed in the United States
Windows games
Windows-only games